The 1892 Buchtel football team represented Buchtel College in the 1892 college football season. The team was led by first-year head coach Frank Cook, in his only season. Buchtel were outscored by their opponents by a total of 69–180.

Schedule

References

Buchtel
Akron Zips football seasons
Buchtel football